Miodrag Gavrilović (born 6 April 1973) is a Serbian politician. A member of the Democratic Party, he has served as one of the party's vice-presidents since 2021. He has been a member of the National Assembly since 1 August 2022.

Early life 
Gavrilović was born on 6 April 1973 in Užice, SR Serbia, SFR Yugoslavia. He grew up in Čajetina, though finished a gymnasium in Užice and graduated from the Faculty of Law of University of Belgrade.

Career 
Gavrilović has been a member of the Democratic Party (DS) since 1991. He was one of the founding members of Otpor, an organisation which played a key role in the overthrow of Slobodan Milošević. As of 2021, he has been one of the vice-presidents of DS.

Gavrilović was the candidate of the United for the Victory of Serbia coalition for the 2022 Serbian parliamentary election. He became a member of the National Assembly on 1 August 2022.

Personal life 
He has been married to Dragana Tomić-Gavrilović since 2000, with whom he has two children. Besides his native Serbian, he speaks French and English. By profession, he is a lawyer.

References 

1973 births
Living people
Politicians from Užice
Democratic Party (Serbia) politicians
Members of the National Assembly (Serbia)
University of Belgrade Faculty of Law alumni